Malik Jones (born December 6, 2002) is an American ice sled hockey player. He was a member of the United States national team that won gold at the 2022 Winter Paralympics.

Career
Jones represented the United States at the 2022 Winter Paralympics and won a gold medal. He became the second black athlete to represent the U.S. in sled hockey at the Paralympics.

Personal life
Jones has been playing sled hockey since the age of seven. He was born without shinbones and had his legs amputated at 10 months old.

References 

2002 births
Living people
Sportspeople from Aurora, Colorado
American sledge hockey players
Paralympic sledge hockey players of the United States
Paralympic gold medalists for the United States
Para ice hockey players at the 2022 Winter Paralympics
Medalists at the 2022 Winter Paralympics
Paralympic medalists in sledge hockey
21st-century American people